MasterChef Vietnam 2015 is the third season of the reality TV show MasterChef Vietnam. The original MasterChef program was developed by BHD Company in United Kingdom with Vietnam Television buying copyright and implementation. Unlike most series around the world, local celebrities will compete for prize money along with amateur cooks. Christine Ha, the first blind and Asian winner for season 3 of US version of Master Chef became the third judge, having been a guest judge in the previous two series and in MasterChef US season 4 and MasterChef US season 6. She is the first former contestant and winner worldwide to become a judge.

Top 13

Elimination table

 
 (WINNER) This cook won the competition
 (RUNNER-UP) This cook finished in second place.
 (WIN) The cook won the individual challenge (Mystery Box Challenge, Elimination Test or Dining Family Challenge).
 (WIN) The cook was on the winning team in the Team Challenge and was directly advanced to the next round.
 (HIGH) The cook was one of the top entries in the individual challenge, but did not win.
 (IN) The cook was not selected as a top entry or bottom entry in an individual challenge.
 (IMM) The cook was select by Mystery Box Challenge winner and did not have to compete in the Elimination Test.
 (IMM) The cook was selected by Mystery Box Challenge winner and didn't have to compete in the Elimination Test.
 (PT) The cook was on the winning team in the Team Challenge, but still competed in the Pressure Test, and advanced.
 (PT) The cook was on the losing team in the Team Challenge, competed in the Pressure Test, and advanced.
 (NPT) The cook was on the losing team in the Team Challenge, but was exempted from the Pressure Test.
 (LOW) The cook was one of the bottom entries in an individual elimination challenge, but was not the last person to advance.
 (LOW) The cook was one of the bottom entries in an individual elimination challenge, and was the last person to advance.
 (LOW) The cook was one of the bottom entries in the Team Challenge, but advanced.
 (ELIM) The cook was out from MasterChef.

Episodes

References

Vietnam
2010s Vietnamese television series